Frederic Enrico Rossovich (born August 28, 1957) is an American actor. Rossovich began acting in the early 1980s, first gaining recognition for portraying Ron "Slider" Kerner in the 1986 film Top Gun. Rossovich's other movies include the thriller-drama The Lords of Discipline (1983), the sex comedy Losin' It (1983), the science fiction film The Terminator (1984), the romantic comedy Roxanne (1987), the witchcraft-themed thriller Spellbinder (1988), the thriller Paint It Black (1989), the military action film Navy SEALs (1990), and the Disney Channel Original Movie Miracle in Lane 2 (2002).
Rossovich is also recognized for his lead role in the TV-series Pacific Blue, often described as a "Baywatch on bikes," which ran on the USA Network for five seasons between March 1996 and April 2000, and also gained popularity abroad. He also portrayed Dr. John Taglieri in the first season of E.R., and Spud Lincoln in the CBS series Sons and Daughters (1991).

Biography 
Rossovich was born Frederic Enrico Rossovich in Palo Alto, California and grew up in Grass Valley, California eventually graduating from Nevada Union High School. His brother, Tim, was a former professional football player and also an actor. He attended college at Sacramento State University. He was a bodybuilder during his late teens and early twenties. Rossovich has Croatian and Italian ancestry; his mother's family originates from the Tuscany region of Italy, while his father's family comes from Istria, Croatia. His great-grandfather emigrated to the United States from Mošćenička Draga, a coastal town in Istria, Croatia, whence the surname Rossovich originates, as it was first found there.

He has been married since 1985 to Eva Rossovich, with whom he has two children: Roy (1986) and Isabel (1991).

Career
Rossovich's first big movie break came when he was cast as Cadet First Lieutenant Dante Pignetti in the drama-thriller The Lords of Discipline, with Bill Paxton and Michael Biehn. The movie helped launch Paxton's and Biehn's careers, and Rossovich would go on to work again with both Biehn and Paxton in The Terminator and Navy SEALs. He and Paxton worked together also in Streets of Fire, an American neo-noir rock musical film directed and co-written by Walter Hill. Rossovich's next movie was Losin' It, a "teenage romp down to Mexico... and [Rossovich] played a marine who the kids kept coming across, and which resulted in some high jinks." Losin' It was Tom Cruise's first lead role. Rossovich and Cruise, who Rossovich considers "a great guy," first met on the set of Losin' It. The two would become friends, and go on to star together in Rossovich's biggest hit and one of Tom Cruise's most memorable works, Top Gun. On the set of Top Gun, Rossovich also "really bonded with Val Kilmer," partly due to their respective roles in the movie and the relationship of their characters. Rossovich has stated that bonding with Kilmer came "so naturally," and that he and Kilmer were "kind of like brothers." In 1984, Rossovich was cast as Ginger's boyfriend Matt in The Terminator. Between The Terminator and Top Gun, Rossovich starred in Streets of Fire, where he plays Officer Cooley, and meets again with Bill Paxton; the sci-fi horror film Warning Sign, where he plays Bob; the action film Let's Get Harry, in which he plays Kurt Kleein; and the neo noir mystery film The Morning After, where he plays 'the Detective.'

Late 1980s
In the wake of Top Gun, Rossovich gained a major role in the Golden Globe nominee and critically acclaimed Roxanne, a modern retelling of Cyrano de Bergerac starring Steve Martin and Daryl Hannah. He subsequently went on to star in the thriller Spellbinder alongside  Kelly Preston; the dark fantasy horror comedy Waxwork; and the thriller Paint It Black, alongside Martin Landau and Sally Kirkland.

1990s
Rossovich started off the 1990s with what would become one of his most notable roles, that of Corpsman James Leary in the military action film Navy SEALs, alongside Charlie Sheen, Michael Biehn and Bill Paxton, with whom he had already worked multiple times. Rossovich starred in a number of minor movies in the early 1990s, the most notable of which being the direct-to-video erotic thriller Cover Me, alongside Paul Sorvino, Elliott Gould and Corbin Bernsen. In the late 1990s Rossovich landed a role on the long-running American medical drama television series E.R., playing Dr. John "Tag" Taglieri, Carol Hathaway's love interest in season one. The affair between Taglieri and Hathaway is one of main concerns of the first season of E.R.. From 1996 to 1998, Rossovich starred as the lead character in the crime drama series Pacific Blue. The series achieved some success in the U.S., and was run in many other countries; in some of these (such as Italy) the series is still being broadcast on national television to this day. In the late 1990s, Rossovich starred in a few other movies, the most notable of which being Truth or Consequences, N.M. with Kiefer Sutherland and the 1998 romantic comedy Telling You, for which he made an uncredited cameo.

2000s
Rossovich's career, which had been declining in the late ‘90s, came to a halt in the 2000s. He starred in the Disney Channel Original Movie Miracle in Lane 2 alongside Malcolm in the Middle'''s star Frankie Muniz in 2000 and in the crime film Artworks alongside Virginia Madsen in 2003 before going into retirement. Upon selling his Hollywood Hills home, Rossovich moved from L.A. to Ojai, California, where he and his wife had spent 18 months restoring a house in the early ‘90s. He then moved to Sweden, where he resides today. After giving up cinema and his  Hollywood life, Rossovich attempted a return to acting in 2012, with the comedy drama Sandbar. Rossovich doesn't appear to be contemplating to return to acting steadily, as in 2012 he stated "I’ve had a really great marriage and kids. I’ve saved my money and invested. I can do what I want. I guess that's a blessing and a curse. It takes away some of your drive to go out and be a workaholic."Rossovich has appeared in over 30 films, including:
 The Terminator (as Matt) (1984)
 Top Gun (as 'Slider') (1986)
 Roxanne (as Chris McConnell) (1987)
 Navy SEALs (as Corpsman James Leary) (1990)

He also appeared in several TV series, including:
 Pacific Blue (as Lieutenant Anthony Palermo, 1995–1998)
 ER as Dr. John Taglieri (1994–1995)
 Black Scorpion as Walker
 Sons and Daughters as Spud Lincoln (1991)

Rossovich has made guest appearances in such TV shows as Tales from the Crypt, Mad About You, Murder She Wrote and Due South. In 2007, he appeared with his son, Roy, in an episode of House Hunters International'' set in Stockholm, Sweden.

Filmography

Film

Television

Music videos

Video games

References

External links
 
 

1957 births
American male film actors
American male television actors
American people of Croatian descent
American people of Italian descent
Living people
Male actors from Palo Alto, California
Players of American football from California
20th-century American male actors
21st-century American male actors